Paengaroa Mainland Island or Paengaroa Scenic Reserve is a mainland island in the Manawatū-Whanganui Region of New Zealand.

It is managed by the Department of Conservation and became a mainland island in 1990.

The park has many rare plant species. It features a short ten minute walk including a bridge over Hautapu River.

See also
 Mainland islands

References

Protected areas of Manawatū-Whanganui